Laurieston Football Club was a Scottish association football club based in the village of Laurieston, Stirlingshire. The club was founded in 1884 and disbanded in 1895. The club competed in the Scottish Cup for five seasons between 1886 and 1890 as well as the regional Stirlingshire Cup competition. From 1891 onwards, the club's home colours were amber and black vertical striped shirts with navy blue shorts.

References 

Defunct football clubs in Scotland
Association football clubs established in 1884
1884 establishments in Scotland
Association football clubs disestablished in 1895
1895 disestablishments in Scotland